Holzbrücke Rapperswil-Hurden is a wooden pedestrian bridge between the city of Rapperswil and the village of Hurden crossing the upper Lake Zürich (Obersee) in Switzerland. The prehistoric timber piles discovered to the west of the Seedamm date back to 1523 BC. The island settlement Technikum is a prehistoric pile-dwelling (or stilt house) settlement which is part of the UNESCO World Heritage Site Prehistoric Pile dwellings around the Alps. Between 1358 and 1360, Rudolf IV, Duke of Austria, built a 'new' wooden bridge across the lake that was used until 1878. On 6 April 2001, the reconstructed wooden footbridge was opened, being the longest wooden bridge in Switzerland.

Geography 
The pedestrian bridge is located next to the so-called Seedamm, as of the today, on upper Lake Zürich (Obersee), and connects Rapperswil, canton of St. Gallen, and Hurden, canton of Schwyz. From Rapperswil railway station it is just a few minutes’ walk, starting right next to the Hochschule für Technik Rapperswil. Its filigree timber structure invites the hiker to observe the richly varied flora and fauna in the nature reserve situated around the small islands neighboring the so-called Heilig Hüsli.

History

Neolithic and Roman bridges between the lake shores 

The prehistoric timber piles discovered to the west of the dam date back to 1523 BC. Situated not far from Heilig Hüsli a lakeside settlement was discovered, where a hamlet was built around 1650 to 1500 BC on a small island. At the present village of Kempraten respectively the Roman Vicus Centum Prata on Kempratnerbucht, there was the Roman transshipment harbour for goods that have been transported on the Roman street towards Vitudurum, passing the Irgenhausen Castle, on the wooden bridge, and on the waterway Zürich–Walensee between the Roman heartland and the northwestern Roman provinces.

Medieval bridge (1358–1878) 
Historians mention a 10th-century ferry station assumably at the so-called Einsiedlerhaus in Rapperswil  – in 981 AD as well as the vineyard on the Lindenhof hill – between Kempraten on lake shore, Lützelau and Ufenau island and assumably present Hurden, which allowed the pilgrims towards Einsiedeln to cross the lake before the prehistoric bridge at the Seedamm isthmus was re-built. By 1358, ferry services between Rapperswil and Hurden are mentioned. A small wooden bridge from Ufenau island to Hurden is mentioned around 1430, so-called Kilchweg in die Uffnow (literally: churchgoing to the Ufnau island).
 
In 1873 the Swiss federal parliament approved the construction of the Seedamm's stone dam and the southeastern and southwestern bridges. Construction works have been begun in 1875 and finished in 1878 – in the same year the Middle Ages wooden bridge was broken.

Reconstructed bridge (2001) 
On 6 April 2001 the reconstructed wooden footbridge was opened alongside the Seedamm. It was built within nine months in quite the same place as the original neolithic and medieval bridges linking Rapperswil with the nearby bridge chapel (Heilig Hüsli) built in 1551. This connection for centuries has been part of old pilgrimage routes, the so-called Jakobsweg to the Einsiedeln Abbey. The old pilgrimage way leads from Wattwil over the Ricken pass to Schmerikon on to Lachen and along the left bank of the lake to Pfäffikon. Another route leads from Schmerikon along the lake to Rapperswil and then over the wooden bridge respectively from Constance over the Hörnli mountain through Zürcher Oberland via Rapperswil and the wooden bridge to St. Meinrad pass (Etzel mountain) and heads to Einsiedeln.

The new wooden bridge opened in 2001 is significant internationally and historically. As mentioned this narrowest part of the Lake Zürich was already bridged in pre-Bronze Age times. The Middle Ages wooden bridge, with loose planks, was built from 1358 to 1360, while the last one was demolished in 1878 when the Seedamm was built. Piling started on 9 August 2000, the bridge was officially opened on 6 April 2001.

Nature reserve 
The lake and the small islands between the timber piles and the dam are designated as a nature reserve. Together with an artificial island made of gravel, they form one of the most important waterfowl breeding areas. For this reason, fishing from the wooden bridge is prohibited, as is swimming and mooring boats in the area.

After the Seedamm was built in 1878, the Heilig Hüsli chapel was the only remaining structure of the medieval wooden bridge. It stood isolated in the lake and was not accessible to visitors until the reconstruction of the former wooden bridge was erected in 2001.

Cultural Heritage 
Located on Obersee lakeshore at the Seedamm isthmus between the Zürichsee and the Obersee lake area, the area was in close vicinity to the Prehistoric lake crossings, neighbored by four Prehistoric pile dwelling settlements:  Freienbach–Hurden Rosshorn, Freienbach–Hurden Seefeld, Seegubel and Rapperswil-Jona–Technikum.

As well as being part of the 56 Swiss sites of the UNESCO World Heritage Site Prehistoric pile dwellings around the Alps, the settlements are also listed in the Swiss inventory of cultural property of national and regional significance as Class objects of national importance.

See also 
 Prehistoric pile dwellings around Zürichsee

Literature 
 Beat Eberschweiler: Ur- und frühgeschichtliche Verkehrswege über den Zürichsee: Erste Ergebnisse aus den Taucharchäologischen Untersuchungen beim Seedamm. In: Mitteilungen des Historischen Vereins des Kantons Schwyz, Ausgabe 96, Schwyz 2004.
 Hans Rathgeb: Brücken über den See. Hrsg. von der Arbeitsgemeinschaft Fussgänger-Holzsteg Rapperswil-Hurden, Rapperswil 2001. 
 Dieter Trachsler: Pilgerwege der Schweiz: Jakobsweg; Schwabenweg: Konstanz – Einsiedeln, unter besonderer Berücksichtigung des Zürcher Oberlandes. Hrsg. Zürcher Wanderwegen (ZAW), 2. Auflage, Wetzikon 2000.

References

External links 

 Europäischer Fernwanderweg E1 durch die Schweiz on wandersite.ch 

Pedestrian bridges in Switzerland
Buildings and structures completed in 1360
Bridges completed in 2001
Bridges completed in the 2nd millennium BC
Buildings and structures in Rapperswil-Jona
Buildings and structures in the canton of Schwyz
Tourist attractions in the canton of Schwyz
Archaeological sites in Switzerland
Cultural property of national significance in the canton of St. Gallen
Cultural property of national significance in the canton of Schwyz
Tourist attractions in Rapperswil-Jona
Important Bird Areas of Switzerland
Bridges completed in the 14th century
2nd-millennium BC establishments
14th-century establishments in Switzerland
21st-century architecture in Switzerland